Umkhonto may refer to:

 Umkhonto, the Zulu word for spear
 SAS Umkhonto, a South African Navy submarine
 Umkhonto (missile), a South African surface-to-air missile
 Umkhonto we Sizwe, the military wing of the African National Congress (ANC) in South Africa.
 Umkhonto We Sizwe (Spear of the Nation), a reggae album by Prince Far I